Social Guarantees were a series of progressive political reforms made in Costa Rica in the 1940s as a result of the alliance between various political and religious figures, for the benefit of the working classes. Although there were several actors behind them, the three main leaders of them were:

 Rafael Ángel Calderón Guardia, president in the 1940–1944 period and leader of the National Republican Party and the political tendency known as Calderonismo.
 Manuel Mora Valverde, deputy and leader of the Costa Rican Communist Party.
 Víctor Manuel Sanabria Martínez, archbishop of San José and leader of the Catholic Church of Costa Rica.

The reforms were diverse and varied, however the three main ones were:

 Creation of the Costa Rican Social Security Fund that universalized healthcare. Through the enactment of the law of the Savings Bank, all employers were obliged to insure their employees and make the corresponding payments to the worker-employer's quota, which allowed the insured, his spouse and his immediate ascending or descending family to receive healthcare by half of the services of the Fund. All minors under the age of 18 who are resident in the country without distinction of nationality are automatically insured by the state. Uninsured persons (unemployed, for example) can also receive the services of the Caja on credit and generally at lower costs than a private medical service.
 Creation of the University of Costa Rica, which provides higher education to Costa Ricans. The UCR became the best university in Central America and is currently rated as one of the best in the world ranking of universities.
 Promulgation of the Labor Code, a labor law that covers all workers in Costa Rica and that posed a series of pioneering rights for the time in any country in Latin America, including the minimum wage, eight-hour workday, holidays, vacations, social charges, Aguinaldo (compulsory Christmas bonus), double payment of salary to work on holidays, the right to strike and severance payments in case of being dismissed without justification, as well as the specific reasons for which an employee can be dismissed without a severance payment (although in this case the accrued vacation and aguinaldos must still be paid, this being part of the salary and not bonuses).

These reforms were included in a specific chapter of the Political Constitution.

The 48 War

The Social Guarantees generated great popular support but also the discontent and anger of the most powerful classes including the coffee oligarchy, the creole aristocracy, some intellectual sectors and won the distrust of the US government that looked badly on Calderon's relationship with communism. In addition, a series of measures taken by the Calderonista government swelled the ranks of the opposition, as was the persecution of Germans and Italians, which included the confiscation of their property and their detention in concentration camps after declaring war on the Third Reich during the World War II, accusations of electoral fraud and corruption as well as accusations of repression of opponents.

In the opposition, among others, José Figueres Ferrer was at the time a little-known character who would have a huge role in post-war Costa Rican politics, Otilio Ulate Blanco, a journalist and a conservative politician, León Cortés Castro, an ex-president who had served in Calderon's own Republican Party but later defected and was even an opposition candidate in 1944. Cortés has been accused of sympathies for fascism and anti-Semitism, during his government he persecuted Jews and communists, the opposite of Calderón who was an ally of the Communist Party and who persecuted Germans and Italians when declaring war on fascism. Castro was a candidate against the Republican candidate supported also by the communists Teodoro Picado Michalski, the son of a Polish immigrant whose community had been persecuted by Cortés.

In 1948 after that year's elections between the Victory Bloc (the coalition of Calderón and Communists, the latter participating as part of the so-called Popular Fronts that took place in several nations at the international level) that nominated Calderón for the second time and the opposition that postulated Ulate, both sides are accused of electoral fraud and the war of 48 breaks out. The opposition camp was led by José Figueres, commander of the National Liberation Army, along with various allies such as the Caribbean Legion and the anti-communist forces led by Frank Marshall who had dual Costa Rican and German nationality and whose family had been persecuted by Calderón.

The opposition wins the civil war defeating Calderonismo. Calderón goes into exile in Nicaragua and then in Mexico as well as Mora Valverde also emigrates to Mexico. However, before the end of the war Mora and Figueres negotiate by signing the Pact of Ochomogo and the Pact of the Embassy of Mexico, where Mora is committed to surrender in exchange for Figueres does not revert Social Guarantees, which Figueres agrees.

In fact, Figueres himself, who exercised the de facto presidency for less than two years before giving power to Otilio Ulate, made a series of socialist and progressive reforms that included the creation of the Costa Rican Institute of Electricity, women's suffrage, the end of racial segregation (before 48 blacks could not leave certain areas or vote), the nationalization of the Bank and the abolition of the army. That is why it is generally accepted in Costa Rican historiography that the four great social reformers of the country were Rafael Ángel Calderón Guardia, Manuel Mora Valverde, José Figueres Ferrer and Víctor Manuel Sanabria Martínez. The first three created their own ideologies of transcendence throughout history such as Calderonismo, Figuerismo and communismo a la tica (tico-style communism).

Figueres said he was visited by several representatives of the most conservative business, including Ricardo Castro Beeche, Francisco Jiménez Ortiz (shareholder of the Nation Group), Fernando Lara Bustamante and Sergio Carballo who urged him to roll back the Social Guarantees and abolish the Labor Code and the Costa Rican Social Security Fund, offering him in return the presidency of the country and placing the Great Capital and the press at his service. Figueres declined indignantly and reported it to Ulate.

Outcome
Social Guarantees had an important impact on Costa Rican social and economic development. Universal healthcare has allowed the country to have one of the highest health rates (it is currently considered an important destination for medical tourism and has the highest levels of lowest of infant mortality in Latin America only below Cuba), compulsory public education up to high school has allowed it to have a literacy level of 98% (one of the highest in Latin America) while the creation of the ICE has provided the country with accessibility in telecommunications and electrification of 90% of the territory.

Another important aspect is the Labor Code, which provides Costa Rican wage earners with a series of rights that are even higher than those of some developed countries (such as the United States) and according to some studies may have contributed to the creation of a strong middle class. In any case in Costa Rica there was never the semifeudalization that occurred in the rest of Central America, and since its identity began to develop, the differences between social classes were never very marked.

See also
 Reform State

References

History of Costa Rica
Politics of Costa Rica
20th century in Costa Rica